James White (born ) is an American former basketball player who is best known for winning the Haggerty Award while in college. He played for St. John's for three seasons (between 1939–40 and 1941–42) and was a proficient scorer in an era when games were much lower scoring than they are today. During his sophomore year in 1939–40, White averaged 8.7 points per game in leading the Redmen to a 15–5 overall record and a berth in the 1940 National Invitation Tournament. They lost in the quarterfinals (which was also the first round back then) to Duquesne.

As a junior, White averaged 10.2 points per game. Then, as a senior in 1941–42, he averaged 9.5 per game. That year he received the Haggerty Award, which is an annual award given since 1935–36 to the best male collegiate basketball player in the New York City metropolitan area.

He played one season of professional basketball with the Elizabeth Braves in the American Basketball League. He eventually became a businessman and served as vice-president of NBC Television. In 1992, he was inducted into St. John's University Athletic Hall of Fame.

References

American Basketball League (1925–1955) players
American men's basketball players
Basketball players from New York City
Guards (basketball)
St. John's Red Storm men's basketball players
Possibly living people
1920s births
Year of birth uncertain